

CoreConnect is a microprocessor bus-architecture from IBM for system-on-a-chip (SoC) designs. It was designed to ease the integration and reuse of processor, system, and peripheral cores within standard and custom SoC designs. As a standard SoC design point, it serves as the foundation of IBM or non-IBM devices. Elements of this architecture include the processor local bus (PLB), the on-chip peripheral bus (OPB), a bus bridge, and a device control register (DCR) bus. High-performance peripherals connect to the high-bandwidth, low-latency PLB. Slower peripheral cores connect to the OPB, which reduces traffic on the PLB. CoreConnect has bridging capabilities to the competing AMBA bus architecture, allowing reuse of existing SoC-components.

IBM makes the CoreConnect bus available as a no-fee, no-royalty architecture to tool-vendors, core IP-companies, and chip-development companies. As such it is licensed by over 1500 electronics companies such as Cadence, Ericsson, Lucent, Nokia, Siemens and Synopsys.

The CoreConnect is an integral part of IBM's embedded offerings and is used extensively in their PowerPC 4x0 based designs. In the past, Xilinx was using CoreConnect as the infrastructure for all of their embedded processor designs.

Processor Local Bus (PLB) 
General processor local bus
Synchronous, nonmultiplexed bus
Separate Read, Write data buses
Supports concurrent Read, Writes
Multimaster, programmable-priority, arbitrated bus
32-bit up to 64-bit address
32-/64-/128-bit implementations (to 256-bit)
66/133/183 MHz (32-/64-/128-bit)
Pipelined, supports early split transactions
Overlapped arbitration (last cycle)
Supports fixed, variable-length bursts
Bus locking
High bandwidth capabilities, up to 2.9 GB/s.

On-chip Peripheral Bus (OPB) 
Peripheral bus for slower devices
Synchronous, nonmultiplexed bus
Multimaster, arbitrated bus
Up to a 64-bit address bus
Separate 32-bit Read, Write buses
Pipelined transactions
Overlapped arbitration (last cycle)
Supports bursts
Dynamic bus sizing, 8-, 16-, 32-bit devices
Single-cycle data transfers
Bus locking (parking)

Device Control Register (DCR) bus 

This bus:

 provides fully synchronous movement of GPR data between CPU and slave logic
 functions as a synchronous, nonmultiplexed bus
 has separate buses to read and to write data
 consists of a single-master, multiple-slave bus
 includes a 10-bit address bus
 features 32-bit data buses
 uses two-cycle minimum Read/Write cycles
 utilizes distributed multiplexer architecture
 supports 8-, 16-, and 32-bit devices
 performs single-cycle data transfers

External links 
 CoreConnect bus architecture, IBM.com
 CoreConnect Technology , Xilinx.com
 CoreConnect licensing, IBM.com
 CoreConnect: The On-Chip Bus System, ElectronicDesign.com
 Device Control Register Bus 3.5 Architecture Specifications

Computer buses
IBM computer hardware